Dean Martin Gaffney (born 14 February 1978) is an English actor, known for his role as Robbie Jackson on the BBC soap opera EastEnders from 1993 to 2003 and 2017 to 2019; he also made guest appearances in 2004, 2010 and 2015. In 2006, he competed in the ITV series I'm a Celebrity...Get Me Out of Here! and finished in fifth place.

Early life
Gaffney was born in Hammersmith, London. He attended St Mark's Catholic School, Hounslow, and later trained at the Sylvia Young Theatre School in Marylebone and the Corona Theatre School in Kew Bridge.

Career

EastEnders
Gaffney's first appearance as Robbie Jackson in EastEnders aired in December 1993, and he remained in the role for 11 years. In 2003, executive producer Louise Berridge made the decision to axe Gaffney along with the actress Bindya Solanki, who played his on-screen girlfriend Nita Mistry. In a press report, Berridge commented, "We do feel that the characters have reached the end of their natural course in the show, and they will both be leaving in Spring 2003". Gaffney made a further appearance in the soap, returning for a brief visit in 2004 for the wedding of his on-screen half-sister Sonia Jackson (portrayed by Natalie Cassidy).

On 25 October 2009, it was announced Gaffney would briefly reprise his role as Jackson. In June 2015, it was announced Gaffney would once again briefly reprise his role as part of Coulson's departure from the show. On 17 April 2017, it was announced he would return to the soap full-time. Gaffney was written out of the soap in 2019 amid concerns over his behaviour off-set.

Other roles
In 1991, Gaffney played the Boy (alternating with another actor) in Samuel Beckett's Waiting for Godot in the West End, alongside Rik Mayall and Adrian Edmondson.

In November 2006, Gaffney appeared as a guest star on the long-running ITV serial drama The Bill. Gaffney played Gavin Josef, a cocky wide-boy who was connected to an assault investigation. In 2007, Gaffney toured with the Agatha Christie Theatre Company, performing The Unexpected Guest. He played Jan, a 19-year-old murder suspect with learning difficulties. During Christmas 2011, he appeared in pantomime at the Thurrock Thameside Theatre in Grays, Essex.

In 2015, Gaffney starred as Wishee Washee, in the pantomime Aladdin, staged at The Brindley in Runcorn.

In November 2022, Gaffney is due to appear in a charity football match in Chatham, Kent.

Personal life
Gaffney lives in Hertford, Hertfordshire. He and Sarah Burge are the parents of twin daughters, Charlotte and Chloe. Gaffney and Burge were in a relationship for 22 years and were engaged. While appearing on I'm a Celebrity...Get Me Out of Here!, Gaffney admitted to David Gest that he had had an affair. The couple split in 2015.

In January 2013, Gaffney suffered serious head injuries when a car he was travelling in collided with the central reservation on the A38 in Derby. Gaffney admitted he had not been wearing his seat belt at the time of the accident, and said "It could have been a lot worse. One inch down and I would have been blind.  One inch up and I would have been brain damaged." In 2019, Gaffney was involved in two further car crashes, the first, on the M25 in Essex, the second, four months later, outside Elstree Studios.

Filmography

Stage

References

External links

BBC EastEnders cast profile

1978 births
Living people
English people of Irish descent
English male soap opera actors
Alumni of the Sylvia Young Theatre School
People from Hammersmith
I'm a Celebrity...Get Me Out of Here! (British TV series) participants